Percival Spencer (born 24 February 1975) is a former Jamaican sprinter, who specialised in the 100 and 200 meters. He was the 1997 Jamaica National Champion in the 100 m.

He spent his collegiate career at Texas Christian University. He won the 100 and 200 metres at the 1997 Western Athletic Conference track and field championships.

Spencer participated in the 1996 Summer Olympics, and 1997 World Championships in Athletics.

Personal best

References

External links

1975 births
Living people
Jamaican male sprinters
Athletes (track and field) at the 1996 Summer Olympics
Olympic athletes of Jamaica